Achalinus rufescens, also known as rufous burrowing snake and Boulenger's odd-scaled snake, is a species of snake in the family Xenodermatidae.

The species is found in Northern Vietnam and southern and southeastern China, including Hong Kong and Hainan, as far east as Zhejiang.

References

Xenodermidae
Snakes of Asia
Snakes of China
Reptiles of Hong Kong
Snakes of Vietnam
Reptiles described in 1888
Taxa named by George Albert Boulenger